Neocheiropteris is a genus of ferns in the family Polypodiaceae, subfamily Microsoroideae, according to the Pteridophyte Phylogeny Group classification of 2016 (PPG I).

Taxonomy
A molecular phylogenetic study in 2019 suggested that Neocheiropteris was one of a group of closely related genera in the subfamily Microsoroideae, a group the authors termed "Lepisorus sensu lato". It species were embedded in a clade in which none of the genera appeared to be monophyletic:

Species
, the Checklist of Ferns and Lycophytes of the World recognized the following species, while noting that the distinction from Neolepisorus was not clear:
Neocheiropteris ensata (Thunb.) Ching
Neocheiropteris ovata (Wall. ex Hook. & Grev.) Fraser-Jenk.
Neocheiropteris palmatopedata (Baker) Christ
Neocheiropteris triglossa (Baker) Ching

Plants of the World Online submerges Neolepisorus into Neocheiropteris, although placing some species that the Checklist of Ferns and Lycophytes of the World accepts in Neolepisorus in Microsorum.

References

Polypodiaceae
Fern genera
Taxonomy articles created by Polbot